Garrett Reese Hampson (born October 10, 1994) is an American professional baseball center fielder and second baseman for the Miami Marlins of Major League Baseball (MLB). Hampson was drafted by the Colorado Rockies in the 3rd round of the 2016 Major League Baseball draft and made his MLB debut for the team in 2018.

Early life and college career
Hampson was born and raised in Reno, Nevada, and attended Reno High School. He played both basketball and baseball for the Huskies, and hit .469 in three years as a varsity player with 418 hits and 158 runs scored and was a two-time All-State selection as Reno won the Northern Nevada 4A Region baseball champion as a junior and senior. After his senior year, Hampson was drafted by the Washington Nationals in the 26th round 2013 Major League Baseball draft, but opted not to sign and instead play college baseball at Long Beach State.

Hampson played three seasons for the Dirtbags, and was named the Big West Conference Field Freshman of the Year in 2014 and the conference Defensive Player of the Year in 2016. He was a .303 hitter over the course of his collegiate career with 213 hits (seventh-most in school history) and 50 stolen bases (third-most). After the 2014 and 2015 seasons, he played collegiate summer baseball with the Chatham Anglers of the Cape Cod Baseball League.

Professional career

Colorado Rockies
Hampson was drafted by the Colorado Rockies in the 3rd round of the 2016 Major League Baseball draft.  He signed and spent his first professional season with the Boise Hawks where he batted .301 with two home runs, 44 RBIs and 36 stolen bases. He was named the 19th best prospect in the Rockies system prior to the 2017 season. In 2017, he played for the Lancaster JetHawks, posting a .326 batting average with eight home runs, seventy RBIs and 51 stolen bases.

Hampson was called up to the majors for the first time on July 21, 2018, and made his Major League debut that day. In his first Major League season, Hampson hit .275 (11 for 40) with four RBIs and two stolen bases in 24 games.

In 2019, he had the fastest sprint speed of all major league second basemen, at 30.1 feet/second. In 2020, Hampson hit .234 with six stolen bases in seven attempts in 53 games.

In 2021 he tied for the major league lead in bunt hits, with seven.

On November 18, 2022, Hampson was non tendered and became a free agent.

Miami Marlins
On December 18, 2022, Hampson signed a minor league deal with the Miami Marlins. On March 15, 2023, Hampson was selected to the 40-man roster.

References

External links

Long Beach State 49ers bio

1994 births
Living people
Sportspeople from Reno, Nevada
Baseball players from Nevada
Major League Baseball infielders
Colorado Rockies players
Long Beach State Dirtbags baseball players
Chatham Anglers players
Boise Hawks players
Lancaster JetHawks players
Hartford Yard Goats players
Albuquerque Isotopes players